This is a list of people from Pembury, Kent, England.

People born in Pembury
Mark Beeney (b 1967), footballer
Sam Billings (b 1991), cricketer
Imogen Boorman (b 1971), actress
Merlin Carpenter (b 1967), artist
Rob Cross (b 1990) darts player
Rackstraw Downes (b 1939), artist
Charles Ellison (b 1962), cricketer
Angus Fairhurst (1966–2008), artist
Victorine Foot (1920–2000), painter
James Ford (b 1976), cricketer
Simon Gear (b 1974), cricketer
Andrew Giddings (b 1963), keyboardist
James Hamblin (b 1978), cricketer
Shaun Hollamby (b 1964), touring car driver
Kelly Holmes (b 1970), Olympic athlete
Laura Marsh (b 1986), cricketer
Shane MacGowan (b 1957), singer
Sam Palladio (b 1986), actor, singer
Cat Porter (b 1979), television presenter
Adrian Quaife-Hobbs (b 1991), Formula 3 driver
Michel Roux, Jr. (b 1960), chef
Tommy Searle (b 1990), motocross rider
Ed Smith (b 1977), cricketer
Chris Walsh (b 1975), cricketer
Jonathan Williams (b 1993), footballer
Robbie Williams (b 1987), cricketer
Nicholas Wilton (b 1978), cricketer
Jo Woodcock (b 1988), actress
Michael Yardy (b 1980), cricketer

People connected with Pembury
John Barrett (b 1943), headmaster of Kent College, Pembury
Matthew Dixon (1821–1905), soldier, lived in Pembury at the time of his death
Stephen Gardiner (1924–2007), architect, lived in Pembury at the time of his death
Ralph Izzard (1910–92), journalist, lived in Pembury at the time of his death
Billy Kiernan (1925–2006), footballer, lived in Pembury at the time of his death
Alfred Musson (1900–95), cricketer, lived in Pembury at the time of his death
Arthur Osman, nephrologist, worked at Pembury Hospital from the 1940s to 1957
Sophie Rhys-Jones (b 1965), now The Duchess of Edinburgh, attended Kent College, Pembury
Alan Watt (1907–74), cricketer, died in Pembury Hospital
Iain Dale, broadcaster, lives in Pembury

 
Pembury